King of the Cowboys is a 1943 film directed by Joseph Kane and starring Roy Rogers and Smiley Burnette. It is set in Texas during World War II. Life Magazine published an article in their July 12, 1943 by H. Allen Smith about Roy Rogers calling him the "King of the Cowboys-Roy Rogers Kisses the Horse, Not the Heroine".

Plot
Starring in a rodeo, Roy Rogers is secretly summoned by the Governor of Texas who asks Roy to volunteer to track down a sabotage ring. Roy discovers they are members of a travelling show that Roy and Smiley join up with.

Cast
 Roy Rogers as Roy Rogers
 Smiley Burnette as Frog Millhouse
 Bob Nolan as Singer
 Sons of the Pioneers as Themselves
 Peggy Moran as Judy Mason
 Gerald Mohr as Maurice, the Mental Marvel
 Dorothea Kent as Ruby Smith
 Lloyd Corrigan as William Kraley, Governor's Secretary
 James Bush as Dave Mason
 Russell Hicks as Texas Governor Shuville
 Irving Bacon as Alf Cluckus
 Norman Willis as Henchman Buxton
 Forrest Taylor as Lawman with Tex

References

External links 
 
 
 

1943 films
1943 Western (genre) films
American Western (genre) films
American black-and-white films
Films directed by Joseph Kane
Republic Pictures films
1940s spy thriller films
American spy thriller films
World War II films made in wartime
1940s English-language films